was the name of Hyūga Province on the island of Kyushu in the Kojiki.  Its boundaries are within Miyazaki Prefecture.

History
The land of Kumaso is mentioned in the mythological genesis of the island of Kyushu, and also plays a part in a tale of Yamato Takeru - both recorded in the Kojiki.  The history of Komaso started and ended before the Ritsuryō province system was established at the beginning of the 8th century with the Taihō Code.

References

Former countries in Japanese history

ja:熊襲#国産み神話